"I Need a Lover" is the debut single by John Mellencamp, first released in 1978 under the stage name "Johnny Cougar".

Background
The song appeared on his 1978 album A Biography, which was not released in the United States. After becoming a top 10 hit in Australia, the song was later included on his 1979 follow-up album John Cougar to introduce it to U.S. audiences, and was released there as a single, becoming his first U.S. top 40 hit when it reached No. 28 on the Billboard Hot 100 in late 1979.

AllMusic reviewer Stephen Thomas Erlewine described "I Need a Lover" as Mellencamp's "first good song".  Cash Box said that  "Cougar's gutsy, forthright vocals and lyrics are nicely backed by passionate guitar and a footstomping, hell-raising beat."  Record World said that "Cougar's midwestern roots grow into urban urgency on this explosive rocker."

On his inspiration for writing "I Need a Lover", Mellencamp said: "The song's about a friend of mine who goes to Concordia College. When that song was written, he was pretty sad. I told him, ‘You got to get the hell out of the house!’ He’d say, ‘Man, if I only had a girl, she’d make me forget my problems.’ I just said, ‘Well . . . ’"

Mellencamp has also stated that "I Need a Lover" was inspired by the Rolling Stones' 1972 song "Happy".

Cover version

Pat Benatar version

The song was covered and released as the debut single in 1979 by American rock singer Pat Benatar for her debut studio album, In the Heat of the Night (1979). The song became an album-oriented rock radio hit for the singer and has been part of the live set list on tour. Chrysalis Records released a live music video for the song, released in 1981.

Popular culture
Hamilton Leithauser (of indie rock band the Walkmen) performed a version of the song in August 2014 for The A.V. Club A.V. Undercover series.

References 

1978 songs
1978 debut singles
1979 singles
1980 singles
John Mellencamp songs
Songs written by John Mellencamp
Pat Benatar songs
Riva Records singles
Chrysalis Records singles